The Mimosa mine is a large underground mine located in the southern part of Zimbabwe in the Zvishavane District of Midlands Province. Mimosa was the first platinum mine in the Great Dyke of Zimbabwe. It had, as of 2012, platinum reserves estimated at 7.9 million ozs of platinum. The mine produces around 120,000 oz of platinum/year.

History

1. 1926 - 60oz extracted from oxides. 
2. 1966 - 2 vertical shafts sunk – trial mining – 40 000 t processed. 
3. 1971 - Operations suspended.
4. 1975 - Blore Shaft established – 90 000 t processed. 
5. 1978 - Operations suspended.
6. 1990 - Bulk sample to Mintek for test work. 
7. 1990/94 - Reserve estimates and feasibility studies completed. 
8. 1995 - Current operations started @ 212tpd. 
9. 2003 - Current process – 4050tpd.

Ownership
Mimosa is wholly owned by Mimosa Investments Limited, a Mauritius-based company jointly held by Implats and Sibanye-Stillwater in a 50:50 joint-venture.

Geology
The Mimosa Mine is located on the Wedza Geological Complex in the Zimbabwean Great Dyke east of Bulawayo.

Expansion summary

1. Capital cost US$38.1million 
2. Funding – US$30 million Implats equity – Operational flows 
3. Mill commission – Nov 2002 
4. Full mill throughput – Jan 2003 
5. Full mining tonnage – Sept 2003

Mineral processing

1. Design from Mintek test work and past operations 
2. 3 stage crushing  2MF circuit  4e recoveries – 80.6% 
3. Produce final concentrate 
4. Road transport concentrate to Implats 
5. Long-term concentrate off take agreement

Notes and references 

Platinum mines in Zimbabwe